HMS Swift was an S-class destroyer built for the Royal Navy in the Second World War. The ship belonged to the January 1941 order of the Royal Navy from the War Emergency program. The destroyer was launched from the shipyard J. Samuel White in Cowes on 15 June 1943 and was put into service on 12 December 1943.

In early 1944 Swift saw service escorting Arctic Convoys to and from the Kola Inlet. The ship participated in the Normandy landings providing fire support. She was sunk off Sword Beach by mine on 24 June 1944 with 53 casualties.

Design
Swift was one of eight T-class destroyers ordered as the 5th Emergency Flotilla on 9 January 1941. The S-class were War Emergency Programme destroyers, intended for general duties, including use as anti-submarine escort, and were to be suitable for mass-production. They were based on the hull and machinery of the pre-war J-class destroyers, but with a lighter armament (effectively whatever armament was available) in order to speed production.

Displacement was  standard and  full load.

The ship had a main gun armament of four 4.7 inch (120 mm) QF Mk. IX guns on single mountings, capable of elevating to an angle of 55 degrees rather than the 40 degree of previous War Emergency destroyers, giving improved anti-aircraft capability. The close-in anti-aircraft armament was one Hazemayer stabilised twin mount for the Bofors 40 mm gun and four twin Oerlikon 20 mm cannons. Two quadruple mounts for 21 inch (533 mm) torpedoes were fitted, while the ship had an depth charge outfit of four depth charge mortars and two racks, with a total of 70 charges carried.

Swift was fitted with a Type 272 surface warning radar and a high-frequency direction finding (HF/DF) aerial on the ship's tripod foremast, with a Type 291 air warning radar on a pole mast aft and Type 285 fire control radar integrated with the ship's high-angle gun director. She had a crew of 170 officers and other ranks.

Construction and service

Swift was laid down at J. Samuel White's Cowes, Isle of Wight shipyard on 12 June 1942 and was launched on 15 June 1943. She was completed on 6 December 1943, and assigned the Pennant number G46.

Following commissioning and workup, Swift, like the other S-class destroyers, joined the 23rd Destroyer Flotilla of the British Home Fleet.

References

External link

 

1943 ships
S and T-class destroyers
Ships built on the Isle of Wight
Maritime incidents in June 1944
World War II destroyers of the United Kingdom
World War II shipwrecks in the English Channel